Rye Psychiatric Hospital Center was a 34-bed investor-owned mental health facility located in Rye, New York.

History
The name Rye Psychiatric Hospital Center was incorporated in 1973. By 2014 they had closed.

Rye had provided "services for the mentally ill." Patients included those with addictions, and
whose "behavior represents a danger to himself and others."

A famous patient 'vanished' from their facility, a lunatic asylum which The New York Times' described as a Sanitarium. The hospital is sometimes referred to as "Rye Hospital Center''".

Controversy
In 1984 the State of New York claimed that their facility was underutilized (and cut funding); their challenge was rejected.

References

  

Psychiatric hospitals in New York (state)
1973 establishments in New York (state)
2014 disestablishments in New York (state)